Studio illegale is a 2013 Italian comedy film co-written and directed by Umberto Carteni and starring Fabio Volo. It is based on a novel with the same name by Federico Baccomo.

Plot
The lawyer Andrea Campi, in order to make a career, neglects his social life, often forgetting both his girlfriend and friends. His repetitive working days, however, are upset by a demanding task assigned to him by his boss, who puts him face to face with the lawyer Emilie Chomand, whom Andrea immediately falls in love with.

Cast  
 Fabio Volo as Andrea Campi
 Zoé Félix as Emilie Chomand
 Ennio Fantastichini as Giuseppe Sobreroni
 Nicola Nocella as Tiziano Tiraboschi
 Isa Barzizza as Zia Emma
 Erika Blanc as Zia Marta
 Luisella Boni as Moglie Carugato
 Adriano Braidotti as Giovannino
 Jean-Michel Dupuis as Antoine De Montcorbier
 Pino Micol as Severino Carugato
 Marina Rocco as Valentina

See also
 List of Italian films of 2013

References

External links

2013 comedy films
2013 films
Italian comedy films
Films based on Italian novels
Films directed by Umberto Carteni
2010s Italian films
2010s Italian-language films